Salem Obaid (Arabic:سالم عبيد) (born 11 March 1983) is an Emirati footballer who plays as a defender.

Career
He formerly played for Al Urooba, Al-Fujairah, Ajman, Ras Al Khaimah, and Dibba Al-Hisn.

References

External links
 

1983 births
Living people
Emirati footballers
Al Urooba Club players
Fujairah FC players
Ajman Club players
Ras Al Khaimah Club players
Dibba Al-Hisn Sports Club players
UAE Pro League players
UAE First Division League players
Association football defenders
Place of birth missing (living people)